The Edward D. Libbey House is a historic house museum at 2008 Scottwood Avenue in Toledo, Ohio.  Built in 1895, it was the home of Edward Libbey (1854-1925), a businessman who revolutionized the glassmaking industry in the United States.  It was declared a National Historic Landmark in 1983.  It is now owned by a nonprofit organization dedicated to its preservation.

Description and history
The Edward D. Libbey House is located in the Old West End District, at the corner of Scottwood Avenue and Woodruff Avenue. It is a Shingle style home designed by architect David L. Stine and built in 1895.  It is  stories in height, with a foundation of fieldstone and brick, and a shingled exterior.  It has asymmetrical massing typical of the style, with gables of varying size, projecting and recessed sections, and a porch supported by clusters of Tuscan columns.

Edward Libbey, a native of Massachusetts, was trained in the manufacture of glass at the New England Glass Company, and came to Toledo in 1888, where he established a new glassworks with former employees of that firm.  Working with inventor Michael Joseph Owens, Libbey proceeded to revolutionize the manufacture of glass, creating automated equipment for producing all manner of glass products, including light bulbs, bottles, glass tubing, and window glass.  He eventually founded several different firms in support of these and other innovations.

Libbey owned the house until is death in 1925; it is the only significant surviving architectural artifact associated with his life.  It remained a private residence until 1965, when it was purchased by the Toledo Society for the Handicapped.  It has since been acquired by a nonprofit dedicated to its preservation.

Gallery

See also
List of National Historic Landmarks in Ohio
National Register of Historic Places listings in Lucas County, Ohio

References

National Historic Landmarks in Ohio
Houses on the National Register of Historic Places in Ohio
Houses completed in 1895
Houses in Lucas County, Ohio
National Register of Historic Places in Lucas County, Ohio
Buildings and structures in Toledo, Ohio
Shingle Style houses
Shingle Style architecture in Ohio